Bombs Over Burma (also known as The Devil's Sister), based on a story by Milton Raison, is a 1942 American war film directed by Joseph H. Lewis. To depict the Chinese character faithfully, the star, Anna May Wong, and other characters speak Mandarin in the first few minutes of the film.

Plot
In 1942, Chinese guerrillas fighting for the Allied cause in Burma during World War II are helping to build a road. During the construction of a military supply road like the Burma Road and Ledo Road, the project is sabotaged by an English nobleman who is a German agent.

Using a scientific device, the English nobleman is instrumental in the coordination of a Japanese air attack on supply trucks attempting to cross a key bridge.  A Chinese school teacher (Anna May Wong) reveals the schemes of the traitor, and brings about his destruction at the hands of Chinese peasants armed with picks and shovels.

Cast
As appearing in Bombs Over Burma, (main roles and screen credits identified):
 Anna May Wong as Lin Ying
 Noel Madison as Me-Hoi 
 Leslie Denison as Sir Roger Howe 
 Nedrick Young as Slim Jenkins 
 Dan Seymour as Pete Brogranza 
 Frank Lackteen as Hallam 
 Teala Loring as Lucy Dell
 Dennis Moore as Tom Whitley 
 Connie Leon as Ma Sing 
 Hayward Soo Hoo as Ling 
 Richard Loo as Col. Kim 
 Paul Fung as Toy Vendor 
 Richard Wong as Servant

Production
Lack of an adequate budget and a two-week shooting schedule hampered the production, limiting Bombs Over Burma to "B-fare".

Reception
Production values doomed Bombs Over Burma both at the box office and with critics. The review in The New York Times succinctly called it a "dud", loaded with stock shots, even recognizable "California architecture." Later reviews such as that of Leonard Maltin, noted that the film was an "... interesting if failed attempt to make a hard-hitting, topical film ... Director/cowriter Lewis' visual flair can't save a talky, pedestrian script. Wong comes off well, as usual."

Availability
Alpha Video released the film on region-1 DVD on June 28, 2005.

References
Notes

Bibliography

 Evans, Alun. Brassey's Guide to War Films. Dulles, Virginia: Potomac Books, 2000. . 
 Leong, Karen J. The China Mystique: Pearl S. Buck, Anna May Wong, Mayling Soong, and the Transformation of American Orientalism. Berkeley, California: University of California Press, 2005. .
 Taves, Brian.  Joseph H. Lewis, Anna May Wong, and Bombs Over Burma.  In Gary Rhodes, ed. The Films of Joseph H. Lewis.  Detroit, Michigan: Wayne State University Press, 2012.  .

External links 
 
 
 
 
 

1942 films
1940s war drama films
American World War II propaganda films
American aviation films
American black-and-white films
1940s English-language films
Films directed by Joseph H. Lewis
Producers Releasing Corporation films
Films set in Myanmar
American war drama films
1942 drama films